The Diocese of Mount Kilimanjaro is a diocese in the Anglican Church of Tanzania: its current bishop is the Right Reverend Dr Stanley  Hotay.

Notes

Anglican Church of Tanzania dioceses
 
Mount Kilimanjaro
Anglican realignment dioceses